I Used to Be Pretty is a studio album by American band The Flesh Eaters. It was released on January 18, 2019 through Yep Roc Records.

Track listing

Personnel
Chris D. - lead vocals
Dave Alvin - guitar
John Doe - bass
Bill Bateman - drums
D.J. Bonebrake - marimba, percussion
Steve Berlin - saxophone
Julie Christensen - backing vocals

References

2019 albums
The Flesh Eaters albums
Yep Roc Records albums